The Tennessee State Tigers and Lady Tigers are the intercollegiate athletic teams of Tennessee State University (TSU), located in Nashville, Tennessee, United States. The Tigers athletic program is a member of the Ohio Valley Conference (OVC) and competes in the NCAA Division I, including the Football Championship Subdivision. The women's track team is also known as the Tigerbelles.  As a member of the Ohio Valley Conference, Tennessee State is one of three HBCUs competing in Division I that is not a member of an athletic conference made up entirely of historically black institutions (MEAC and SWAC), the other two being Hampton University and North Carolina A&T State University of the Colonial Athletic Association. The TSU mascot is Aristocat the Tiger, and the school colors are blue and white. TSU's main rival was historically Kentucky State University, an HBCU located in the capital of Tennessee's northern neighbor, but that rivalry has faded since KSU is now in NCAA Division II.

Sports sponsored
A member of the Ohio Valley Conference, Tennessee State University sponsors teams in seven men's and eight women's NCAA sanctioned sports.

The only TSU team that competes outside the OVC is the men's tennis team. After the 2021–22 season, the OVC merged its men's tennis league into that of the Horizon League. All OVC men's tennis members, including TSU, became Horizon associates in that sport.

Athletic facilities
Source:

Men's Basketball: Gentry Center

Women's Basketball: Gentry Center

Football: Nissan Stadium & Hale Stadium

Softball: Tiger Stadium

Tennis: TSU Tennis Court Complex

Indoor Track & Field: Gentry Center

Outdoor Track & Field: Edward S. Temple Track

Volleyball: Kean Hall

Highlights
In 1957, coach John McClendon and three-time All-American Dick Barnett led the then-Tennessee Agricultural & Industrial State University to become the first historically black college (HBCU) to win a national basketball title, winning the National Association of Intercollegiate Athletics (NAIA) championship. The school went on to win the NAIA title again in 1958 and '59.

The women's track and field team won the championship of the Amateur Athletic Union national senior outdoor meet for all athletes 13 times in 1955–1960, 1962, 1963, 1965–1967, 1969 and 1978. The team likewise won the AAU national indoor championship 14 times in 1956–1960, 1962, 1965–1969 and 1978–1980.

By 2009, approximately 100 TSU football players had been drafted by the National Football League.

In 2014, From the Rough was released which is a movie based on a true story about the successes and challenges of the first African-American woman (Dr. Catana Starks) to coach a Division I college men's golf team.  Starks helped develop several noteworthy golfers at Tennessee State such as Sean Foley and Robert Dinwiddie.

In 2016, the men's basketball team ranked 17th in the nation for increase in home attendance. During the 2015-2016 basketball season, the men's team tied the school record for the most Division I wins with 20.

The Southern Heritage Classic in Memphis, Tennessee is annually one of the largest and most anticipated HBCU football classics in the nation.

References

External links
 

 
Sports in Nashville, Tennessee